The 1977 World Table Tennis Championships were held in Birmingham at the then newly opened National Exhibition Centre, from March 28 to April 7, 1977.

Organisation
During these Championships, players and officials stayed at the Student Accommodation at the University of Birmingham in Edgbaston, from where coaches took all participants backwards and forwards between here and the NEC daily for the two weeks of the championships. Although run by the ETTA for the ITTF, headed by Mr Maurice Goldstien, Management, Tournament & Coaching Committee members from the BDTTA (Birmingham & District Table Tennis Association) played a major part with six months of preparatory work prior to this event, the first to be held at the NEC. It was also from the BDTTA that many gave freely of their time to help run this championship, through their expertise of running many other local annual table tennis tournaments, such at the 3 star Midlands Open and Birmingham Closed.

Results

Team

Individual

References

External links
ITTF Museum

 
World Table Tennis Championships
World Table Tennis Championships
World Table Tennis Championships
Table tennis competitions in the United Kingdom
International sports competitions in Birmingham, West Midlands
World Table Tennis Championships, 1977
World Table Tennis Championships
World Table Tennis Championships